Chibapsetta dolichurostyli is an extinct species of prehistoric right-eye flounder that lived during the Pleistocene epoch in what is now Japan.

See also

 Prehistoric fish
 List of prehistoric bony fish

References

Pleistocene fish
Pleistocene animals of Asia